Laxminarayan temple is located at IMFA factory of Therubali, Rayagada district, Odisha. The deities Laxminarayan, Hanuman, Lord Jagannath, Balabhadra, Subhadra and Lord Siva are worshiped by thousands of devotees.

History 
Built over 14 years back by the IMFA, the temple is a major attraction of the district.

Tourism
The temple is about 25 km  from the district headquarters. It is one of the tourist attractions of the district. Visitors and devotees visit this place especially more on Tuesdays .

References

External links
"Rayagada tourism"
List of Temples in Rayagada district

Hindu temples in Rayagada district